Fontvieille is a commune in the camargue region in the  Bouches-du-Rhône department  in southern France.

History
The commune was created in 1790, out of the territory of Arles.

The Occitan language poet Brémonde de Tarascon (1858–98) grew up on the Darbousille farm at Fontvieille, where she died.

Population

Sights
 Alphonse Daudet's windmill
 Barbegal aqueduct and mill, a Roman watermill complex located on the territory of the commune

Twin towns
Fontvieille is twinned with Santa Maria a Monte, Italy, since 1991.

See also
 Alpilles
 Communes of the Bouches-du-Rhône department

References

External links
 Tourist office website
 Pictures of Fontvieille

Communes of Bouches-du-Rhône
Bouches-du-Rhône communes articles needing translation from French Wikipedia